The London and South Western Railway B4 class is a class of 0-4-0 tank engines originally designed for station piloting and dock shunting. They were later used extensively in Southampton Docks for nearly half a century.

Design
The locomotives were designed by the London and South Western Railway (LSWR) Locomotive Superintendent William Adams. They were unusual in having inside Stephenson valve gear but outside  cylinders and coal bunkers on the footplate inside the cab. The class were originally built with Adams's design of stovepipe chimney, although these were later replaced by a lipped version designed by Adams' successor, Dugald Drummond. Some examples also had cut away cabs to improve visibility. They were designed for shunting in locations with a sharp curves, such as the dockyard at Devonport and as pilots at the major stations.

Construction
The LSWR originally ordered ten locomotives in 1890 from its Nine Elms Works. The class was designated by their order number  ‘B4’ and delivered during 1891 and 1892. A further ten locomotives were ordered in 1893 which were delivered in November and December of that year under order D6. 

Drummond designed a similar class of five locomotives in 1907, with a slightly smaller boiler and lipped chimney. These were delivered during 1908 under order K14. No. 84, delivered in June 1908 was the last locomotive to be built at Nine Elms Works prior to the works' transfer to Eastleigh. These locomotives were originally regarded as a new class. However, Drummond's successor Robert Urie, considered them to be so similar to the originals, that they were merged with the B4 class in 1912.

Service
The first ten locomotives were allocated to major stations throughout the system including Eastleigh, Exmouth Junction, Bournemouth and Plymouth Friary (for use on Cattedown Wharfs and the Turnchapel branch). In November 1892 the LSWR purchased the Southampton Docks, and so both new and existing B4s were sent there over the next few years to replace the existing motive power as they became worn out. By 1899 their use as station pilots had ceased except at Exeter and fourteen were working in Southampton Docks. Other members of the class were assigned to various depots around the LSWR system, for yard and dock shunting. 

After 1923 the Southern Railway also used them at Dover Marine, Ashford, Stewarts Lane, Hamworthy (for use at Poole Quay) and at Guildford (as a shed pilot). At least two were retained at Eastleigh one of which was used to shunt the cramped goods yard at Winchester City railway station.

Names
The locomotives used by Southampton Docks, were also given names reflecting the destinations of ships then sailing from Southamton numbers.

Withdrawals
Following the introduction of the SR USA class to Southampton Docks in 1947, many of the class were made redundant. Withdrawals began under British Railways in May 1948, but others were still in good condition and eleven were sold during 1948/9 for industrial use. Withdrawals resumed in 1957 following the introduction of diesel shunters and by 1961 only three survived. These were withdrawn in 1963.

Preservation

Two examples of the class have survived into preservation: 
No. 96 (BR 30096) Normandy was sold to Corrall Limited and used at their Southampton coal depot, where it was named Corrall Queen. It has been preserved on the Bluebell Railway where, in the days before the line had any diesel locomotives, it was often used as a shunter. Its boiler certificate expired on 6 July 2006 and it is on static display awaiting overhaul.
 No. 102 (BR 30102) Granville was purchased in 1964, after withdrawal from BR, by Butlins and then displayed alongside LMS Royal Scot class 6100 Royal Scot at the firm's Skegness Holiday Camp. In 1971 it was moved to Bressingham Steam Museum near Diss, Norfolk, where it remains on static display.

References

External links 

 SEMG page

B4
0-4-0T locomotives
Railway locomotives introduced in 1891
Standard gauge steam locomotives of Great Britain